Nacer Bouhanni (born 25 July 1990) is a French professional racing cyclist, who currently rides for UCI ProTeam . A sprinter, he was the winner of the 2012 French National Road Race Championships. Although his first Grand Tour was in 2012, his real breakthrough was in 2014 when he won three stages and the points classification in the Giro d'Italia. In August 2014 it was announced that Bouhanni would leave FDJ and join  on an initial two-year deal from 2015.

Career

FDJ (2011–14)
In January he got his first professional stage win in La Tropicale Amissa Bongo.

Bouhanni won his first stage of the 2012 season by winning stage 1 of the Étoile de Bessèges. Later that season he got his breakthrough win by winning the French National Road Race Championships ahead of his teammate Arnaud Démare. He also rode his first Grand Tour at the Vuelta a España, where his best finish was second on stage 10.

The 2013 season started well with a stage win in the Tour of Oman. Afterwards he rode Paris–Nice, where he got a stage win and the leader's jersey, however he crashed out of the race the very next day. He rode the Giro d'Italia, where he finished second to Mark Cavendish on the first stage, but abandoned on stage 13. He also rode his first Tour de France in 2013, however he got sick and retired after a crash on stage 5.

The 2014 season was very successful for Bouhanni, with numerous wins including three victories in the Giro d'Italia as well as earning the points classification. In the Vuelta a España, Bouhanni won two mass sprints, Stages 2 and 8. The latter saw a battle occur in the crosswinds and Bouhanni managed to stay with the first group on the road to win the sprint ahead of Michael Matthews and Peter Sagan. After withdrawing from the Vuelta, Bouhanni gave an interview where he was critical of the FDJ management.

Cofidis (2015–19)
He had to wait until April 2015 to get his first victory for his new team on the opening stage of the Circuit de la Sarthe in a bunch sprint as the breakaway was caught inside the final kilometre. He also won the last stage of the event. A little later on that month, he won the Grand Prix de Denain for the second year in a row. He won his team's first UCI World Tour race of the season on stage 2 of the Critérium du Dauphiné in a bunch sprint. He added a win on Stage 4 after a hectic finale which saw a flurry of attacks. Bouhanni was forced to withdraw from the 2015 Tour de France after a crash at the  mark of Stage 5.

In 2016, Bouhanni won stage 1 of the Volta a Catalunya and took the leader's jersey. Bouhanni had to withdraw from the French National Road Race Championships due to a hand injury sustained in an altercation with fellow guests at a hotel the night before the race. The injury also caused him to withdraw from the Tour de France. On 21 August, Bouhanni initially won the EuroEyes Cyclassics but he was later relegated for irregular sprinting.

Arkéa–Samsic
In October 2019, Bouhanni signed for the  team.

Incidents
Bouhanni was penalised one minute time for hitting another rider, Jack Bauer, in the 2017 Tour de France. The race jury also levied a fine of 200 Swiss francs. Bouhanni was also investigated after contact with Anthony Maldonado at the end of a stage in the Tour de l'Ain in August. The race jury decided to take no action. Later in 2017, after the Paris–Bourges race, Bouhanni had to be separated from Rudy Barbier, who had won the race. Bouhanni subsequently apologised for his behaviour, but maintained that Barbier had ridden dangerously and irregularly in the finishing sprint. In May 2018, French sports newspaper L'Équipe reported that Bouhanni had been involved in a "violent altercation" with Cofidis directeur sportif Roberto Damiani on the team's bus following the Eschborn–Frankfurt race, which Bouhanni did not finish.

In the 2021 Cholet-Pays de la Loire, Bouhanni initially finished third, but was disqualified by the race jury for an aggressive manoeuvre in the final sprint. Bouhanni started his sprint behind his leadout man, and as he began to accelerate up to speed, he veered to his left to try and get onto the wheel of eventual winner Elia Viviani. In doing so, Bouhanni pinned Jake Stewart against the barriers. Though Stewart was able to stay upright and avoid causing a crash, the contact from Bouhanni sapped his momentum and he ended up finishing 29th. After the race, Stewart and other fellow sprinters took to social media to criticise Bouhanni and call for his suspension, drawing similarities between Bouhanni's actions and those of Dylan Groenewegen at the 2020 Tour de Pologne, which caused Fabio Jakobsen to crash and sustain heavy injuries. On 12 May 2021, for his 'dangerous conduct,' the Union Cycliste Internationale (UCI) handed Bouhanni a retroactive two-month suspension, expiring on 7 June 2021.

Major results

2010
 5th Overall Tour de Gironde
1st Stage 2
2011
 1st Stage 3 La Tropicale Amissa Bongo
 5th Grand Prix de la Somme
 8th Grand Prix de Denain
 8th Paris–Troyes
2012
 1st  Road race, National Road Championships
 1st  Overall Circuit de Lorraine
1st  Points classification
1st  Young rider classification
1st Stage 1
 1st Halle–Ingooigem
 1st Stage 1 Étoile de Bessèges
 1st Stage 1 Tour de Wallonie
 2nd Flèche d'Emeraude
 2nd Paris–Bourges
 6th Overall Tour de l'Eurométropole
1st Stage 4
 9th Cholet-Pays de Loire
 9th Grand Prix de Wallonie
2013
 1st Val d'Ille Classic
 1st Grand Prix de Fourmies
 1st Tour de Vendée
 Tour of Beijing
1st  Points classification
1st Stages 2 & 3
 1st Stage 1 Paris–Nice
 1st Stage 6 Tour of Oman
 1st Stage 2 Circuit de la Sarthe
 2nd Omloop van het Houtland
 3rd Grand Prix de Denain
 3rd Halle–Ingooigem
 3rd Brussels Cycling Classic
 8th Overall Tour du Poitou-Charentes
1st  Points classification
1st Stages 1, 2 & 3
2014
 1st Grand Prix de Denain
 Giro d'Italia
1st  Points classification
1st Azzurri d'Italia classification
1st Stages 4, 7 & 10
 Vuelta a España
1st Stages 2 & 8
Held  after Stages 2–3
 Circuit de la Sarthe
1st  Points classification
1st Stage 1
 1st Stage 1 Paris–Nice
 1st Stage 4 Eneco Tour
 1st Stage 2 Étoile de Bessèges
 1st Stage 1 Critérium International
 2nd Road race, National Road Championships
 3rd Le Samyn
 3rd Nokere Koerse
 10th Road race, UCI Road World Championships
2015
 1st UCI Europe Tour
 1st French Road Cycling Cup
 1st Halle–Ingooigem
 1st Circuito de Getxo
 1st Grand Prix d'Isbergues
 1st Grand Prix de Denain
 1st Nationale Sluitingsprijs
 Critérium du Dauphiné
1st  Points classification
1st Stages 2 & 4
 Circuit de la Sarthe
1st  Points classification
1st Stages 1 & 4
 Tour de l'Ain
1st  Points classification
1st Stages 1 & 2
 2nd Paris–Bourges
 2nd Route Adélie
 3rd Grand Prix de Fourmies
 4th Trofeo Santanyi–Ses Salines–Campos
 6th Milan–San Remo
 9th Polynormande
2016
 1st  Overall Tour de Picardie
1st  Points classification
1st Stages 1 & 2
 1st Tour de Vendée
 Volta a Catalunya
1st Stages 1 & 2
 Tour du Poitou-Charentes
1st Stages 1 & 3
 1st Stage 4 Paris–Nice
 1st Stage 1 Critérium du Dauphiné
 1st Stage 2 Vuelta a Andalucía
 2nd Trofeo Playa de Palma
 2nd Grand Prix de la Somme
 2nd Grand Prix de Fourmies
 3rd Kuurne–Brussels–Kuurne
 3rd Brussels Cycling Classic
 4th Milan–San Remo
 5th Clásica de Almería
 7th Paris–Tours
2017
 1st UCI Europe Tour
 1st Grand Prix de Fourmies
 1st Nokere Koerse
 1st Paris–Camembert
 1st Stage 4 Volta a Catalunya
 1st Stage 2 Tour de Yorkshire
 1st Stage 2 Tour du Poitou-Charentes
 1st Stage 2 Tour de l'Ain
 2nd Road race, National Road Championships
 2nd Grand Prix de Denain
 3rd Scheldeprijs
 3rd Trofeo Playa de Palma
 4th La Roue Tourangelle
 7th Grand Prix d'Isbergues
 8th Milan–San Remo
 8th Bretagne Classic
 9th EuroEyes Cyclassics
2018
 1st Grote Prijs Marcel Kint
 Boucles de la Mayenne
1st  Points classification
1st Stages 2 & 3
 1st Stage 6 Vuelta a España
 1st Stage 1 Route d'Occitanie
 1st Stage 3 Four Days of Dunkirk
 2nd Ronde van Limburg
 6th Overall Dubai Tour
2019
 2nd Grote Prijs Marcel Kint
 4th Three Days of Bruges–De Panne
 5th La Roue Tourangelle
 6th Elfstedenronde
 7th Heistse Pijl
 7th Cholet-Pays de Loire
2020
 1st Overall French Road Cycling Cup
 1st Grand Prix d'Isbergues
 1st Paris–Chauny
 1st Stage 1 Tour de la Provence
 2nd Overall Saudi Tour
1st  Points classification
1st Stage 4
 3rd Brussels Cycling Classic
 3rd Paris–Camembert
 6th Milano–Torino
 8th Trofeo Campos, Porreres, Felanitx, Ses Salines
2021
 2nd La Roue Tourangelle
 2nd Grote Prijs Jef Scherens
 4th Paris–Chauny
 6th Eurométropole Tour
2022
 1st La Roue Tourangelle
 2nd Milano–Torino
 2nd Clásica de Almería
 3rd Classic Brugge–De Panne
2023
 6th Milano–Torino

Grand Tour general classification results timeline

Classic results timeline

References

External links

 
 
 
 
 

1990 births
Living people
French male cyclists
Sportspeople from Épinal
French sportspeople of Algerian descent
French Giro d'Italia stage winners
French Vuelta a España stage winners
2014 Vuelta a España stage winners
Cyclists from Grand Est
21st-century French people
20th-century French people